Polchata is a rural locality (a village) in Beryozovsky District, Perm Krai, Russia. The population was 4 as of 2010.

Geography 
Polchata is located 21 km northeast of  Beryozovka (the district's administrative centre) by road. Tuyasy is the nearest rural locality.

References 

Rural localities in Beryozovsky District, Perm Krai